Copyright law in Tajikistan is covered by the Law on Copyright and Related Rights of Republic of Tajikistan, adopted on 13 November 1998 (Law No. 726) and subsequently amended on 1 August 2003 (Law No. 27). Article 7 of this law defines what is not eligible to Copyright in the Republic. This includes: official documents (laws, court decisions, other texts of legislative, administrative or judicial character) and official translations thereof; state emblems and official signs (flags, armorial bearings, decorations, monetary signs and other State symbols and official signs);  communications concerning events and facts that have informational character; and works of folklore.

See also
 List of parties to international copyright treaties

External links 
 Закон РТ Об авторском праве и смежных правах (Russian)

Tajikistan
Law of Tajikistan